Scopula eburneata is a moth of the  family Geometridae. It is found in Brazil, French Guiana, Jamaica and southern North America, including Texas.

The wingspan is 12–14 mm.

References

Moths described in 1858
eburneata
Moths of North America
Moths of South America